The enzyme acetoacetyl-CoA hydrolase (EC 3.1.2.11) catalyzes the reaction

acetoacetyl-CoA + H2O  CoA + acetoacetate

This enzyme belongs to the family of hydrolases, specifically those acting on thioester bonds.  The systematic name is acetoacetyl-CoA hydrolase. Other names in common use include acetoacetyl coenzyme A hydrolase, acetoacetyl CoA deacylase, and acetoacetyl coenzyme A deacylase.  This enzyme participates in butanoate metabolism.

References

 
 

EC 3.1.2
Enzymes of unknown structure